Club Deportivo ESPOLI is a professional football team from Quito, Ecuador that now plays in the Segunda Categoría, the third level of professional football in country. The team belong to the Escuela Superior de Policía (ESPOLI), a police academy in Quito.

The closest the team has ever come to a national championship was in 1995, when they came in 2nd place in the national tournament to Barcelona. The result allowed them to participate in the 1996 Copa Libertadores, where they were eliminated in the Round of 16.

Stadium
Although based in Quito, the team will be chosen Estadio Olímpico Municipal Etho Vega in Santo Domingo for their home stadium. In the past, they have also hosted home game in Estadio Olímpico Atahualpa (1991–95 and 1995–01) and Estadio Chillogallo (2004) in Quito, Estadio Olímpico in Ibarra (1995 and 2002–04), Estadio Guillermo Albornoz in Cayambe (2005–07), and Estadio La Cocha in Latacunga (2007–09).

Achievements

Serie B (2): 1993, 2005 Apertura

Performance in CONMEBOL competitions
Copa Libertadores: 1 participation (1996)
 Best: Round of 16

Current squad
As of March 1, 2016.

External links
Official website 

 
Espoli
Espoli
ESPOLI
1986 establishments in Ecuador